Windbag the Sailor is a 1936 British comedy film directed by William Beaudine and starring Will Hay. The film marked the first appearance of Hay with Graham Moffatt and Moore Marriott acting as his straight men, however both Moffatt and Marriott had previously acted separately in films starring Hay, namely in Dandy Dick and Where There's a Will, respectively.

Plot
Ben Cutlet is a retired barge captain who entertains his bar room audience with tales of his alleged days at sea, although his maritime experience extends no further than navigating a coal barge. His tall tales catch him out when he is conned into commanding the unseaworthy Rob Roy to the West Indies by a gang of criminals who mean to scuttle the ship for the insurance money. Cutlet gets the upper hand however when he and his companions fall in with West Indian natives who mistake their radio set for a god.

Cast

Will Hay as Captain Ben Cutlet
Moore Marriott as Jerry Harbottle
Graham Moffatt as Albert Brown
Norma Varden as Olivia Potter-Porter
Kenneth Warrington as Yates
Dennis Wyndham as Jim Maryatt
Amy Veness as Emma Harbottle
Leonard Sharp as Crew member

Reception
Writing for The Spectator in 1937, Graham Greene gave the film a good review, recommending it to "those under sixteen". Greene praised Beaudine for his "admirabl[e] direct[ion]", and noted that Hay "has never had a better part than that of Captain Ben Cutlett".

References

External links

1936 films
1936 comedy films
British comedy films
1930s English-language films
British black-and-white films
Seafaring films
Gainsborough Pictures films
Films directed by William Beaudine
Films produced by Michael Balcon
Films with screenplays by Marriott Edgar
1930s British films